Vadim Sergeyevich Bogdanov (born 16 January 1998) is a Russian football player.

Club career
He made his debut in the Russian Football National League for FC Baikal Irkutsk on 12 March 2016 in a game against FC Yenisey Krasnoyarsk.

References

External links
 Profile by Russian Football National League

1998 births
Sportspeople from Irkutsk
Living people
Russian footballers
Association football midfielders
FC Rotor Volgograd players
FC Baikal Irkutsk players